Ruby Commey (born 29 July 1991 in Berlin, Germany) is a German actress. She was born in Berlin and has performed at the Kammerspiele, Deutsches Theater and Berliner Ensemble.

In 2019, she portrayed Germania in the music video for Rammstein's song Deutschland, which was a number-one single in several countries, but also attracted significant controversy due to her being Afro-German.

Filmography

Theater 
Commey has appeared in four different productions at the Deutsches Theater in Berlin:
2013: Vanishing Point Berlin (directed by Tobias Rausch)
2014: Tod.Sünde.7 (directed by Wojtek Klemm)
2015: Alice (directed by Nora Schlocker)
2017: Death of a Salesman (directed by Bastian Kraft)

Music videos
2019: Deutschland (directed by Specter Berlin)

References

External links 
 
 Rammstein "Deutschland" music video

Rammstein
German actresses
1991 births
Living people